Namibotites is a genus of fly in the family Ulidiidae.

Species
Namibotites argentata Barraclough, 2000

Distribution
Namibia.

References

Ulidiidae
Monotypic Brachycera genera
Endemic fauna of Namibia
Diptera of Africa
Brachycera genera